Marcus Daniell (born 9 November 1989) is an inactive New Zealand professional tennis player. He reached his career-high ATP doubles ranking of world No. 34 on 29 January 2018 after reaching the quarterfinals of the Australian Open. He won a bronze medal in the men's doubles at the 2020 Summer Olympics, alongside Michael Venus.

Daniell is a philanthropist and an advocate for effective altruism through his work as the founder of High Impact Athletes and as a member of Giving What We Can.

Tennis career

2010: ATP debut
While mainly playing in futures events, Daniell received a doubles wild card entry to play in the 2010 Heineken Open, an ATP 250 event in his home country of New Zealand.  With new doubles partner, Horia Tecău, they had an improbable run to the finals of the event.  The pair first dispatched fellow New Zealanders the Statham brothers, 6–3, 6–2.  Daniell and Tecău then won a three set showdown against the third seeded Spaniards Tommy Robredo and Marcel Granollers, 3–6. 7–6(5), 10–8.  In the semifinal match Daniell and Tecău faced Johan Brunström and Jean-Julien Rojer who had defeated grand slam winners Lukáš Dlouhý and Leander Paes.  Daniell and Tecău prevailed 3–6, 7–6(4), 10–8 to set up a final with Brazilians Marcelo Melo and Bruno Soares.  In the championship match, Daniell and Tecău won against the Brazilians 7–5, 6–4, each player winning their first ATP World Tour title.

Daniell was to represent New Zealand in both the singles and the doubles, paired with Rubin Statham, at the 2010 Commonwealth Games. However, he had to withdraw due to an ongoing back injury, leaving Statham to compete in the singles alone.

2015
Daniell first teamed up with Brazilian Marcelo Demoliner in the ATP Challenger grass series leading up to Wimbledon.  They followed their runner-up finish to Ken and Neal Skupski at Surbiton by beating the same opponents a week later in the final at Ilkley.

2016
Daniell won the Stuttgart Open with Artem Sitak before again teaming up with Demoliner. They reached their first ATP World Tour final when runners-up in the Swedish Open.

Daniell competed with Michael Venus at the 2016 Summer Olympics, losing a close first round match to Canadians Daniel Nestor and Vasek Pospisil 6–4, 3–6, 6–7 (6).

2017
Daniell and Demoliner reached three ATP World Tour finals, at São Paulo, Lyon and Chengdu, although they were unable to win any of them, and improved their ranking as a team to World number 15.  He achieved his best win when, having had to qualify for the Swiss Indoor tournament in Basel because Demoliner was playing in Vienna, he and new partner Dominic Inglot beat the top seeds, the world's second-ranked pair of Henri Kontinen and John Peers, in the first round.  They eventually lost in the semi-final to Fabrice Martin and Édouard Roger-Vasselin.

2018
After losing in first-round match tie-breaks in both Brisbane and Auckland, Daniell and Inglot won through to the quarter-finals in the Australian Open.  In a high quality three-set match, where they saved match points in both the second and third sets, they lost to the eventual tournament winners, Oliver Marach and Mate Pavić, 4–6, 7–6 (10), 6–7 (5).  Daniell also played in the Mixed Doubles, teaming up with Chinese player Xu Yifan.  They drew third seeds and eventual semi-finalists Ekaterina Makarova and Bruno Soares as their first-round opponents and, although winning the second set, were outclassed in the match tie-break, the final score being 6–3, 5–7, 10–2.

Daniell and Artem Sitak teamed up for the doubles in the Davis Cup tie against China, but were beaten by Gong Mao-Xin and Zhang Ze.  He then returned to the ATP tour with Inglot, losing in the first round in Montpellier before finishing runners-up to Michael Venus and Raven Klaasen in Marseille.  Although Daniell had previously faced a New Zealander (Rubin Statham) in a Challenger doubles final, this was the first time that New Zealanders had been on opposite sides of the net in an ATP World Tour doubles final.  Daniell and Inglot then moved to Dubai, where they lost in a match tie-break in the first round to second seeds Jean-Julien Rojer and Horia Tecău.

Moving on to Indian Wells, Daniell teamed as a one-off with Diego Schwartzman.  After a tough opening match, and a much easier second round, they lost in the quarter-finals to Bob and Mike Bryan, 7–5, 6–1.  The following week in Miami he and Inglot faced the Bryan brothers in the first round, winning the first set but losing the second and being well-beaten in the match tie-break.  They used the Marrakech tournament to start their clay court season, winning in the first round but losing in the second to Divij Sharan and Jan-Lennard Struff.  In that match Daniell aggravated an injury to his right wrist which he had picked up during the Davis Cup tie against China, and announced later that he would miss the rest of the clay court season to concentrate on his rehabilitation. After the French Open it was revealed that Inglot had decided to seek another partner for the grass court season, due to his uncertainty over whether or not Daniell would be fit, and that Daniell would be teaming up with fellow New Zealander Artem Sitak's former partner in Wesley Koolhof.

Daniell returned to tournament play at Queen's Club in London.  He and Koolhof lost in qualifying, but became lucky losers and beat the wildcard combination of Novak Djokovic and Stan Wawrinka in the first round, before going down to Jamie Murray and Bruno Soares in a match tie-break.  In their last tournament before Wimbledon, Daniell and Koolhof lost in the first round at Eastbourne to Ryan Harrison and Nicholas Monroe, again in a match tie-break.

At Wimbledon Daniell and Koolhof lost to qualifiers Sriram Balaji and Vishnu Vardhan in the first round, while in the mixed doubles he and Nadiia Kichenok won their first match, but lost in the second round to 10th seeds Juan Sebastian Cabal and Abigail Spears.  They then returned to the European clay courts, losing in the quarter-finals of the Swedish Open, the semi-finals of the German Open in Hamburg (to Oliver Marach and Mate Pavic), and the first round in Kitzbühel, the latter to Jürgen Melzer and Philipp Petzschner, who had also beaten them in Sweden.

In their last tournament before the US Open, Daniell and Koolhof played at Winston-Salem, losing in the quarter-finals to eventual champions Jean-Julien Rojer and Horia Tecau.  At Flushing Meadows they won their first round match, but lost the second to fourth seeds Jamie Murray and Bruno Soares.

Daniell then travelled to Korea, where he joined the rest of the New Zealand Davis Cup team in Gimcheon.  Scheduled to play the doubles rubber with Artem Sitak, Daniell had to withdraw on the morning of the match due to a recurrence of a back injury, his place being taken by Ajeet Rai.  New Zealand lost the tie 2–3, being relegated to Asia/Oceania Group II for the first time in five years.

Daniell and Koolhof next played in Shenzhen, losing in the quarter-finals to Max Mirnyi and Philipp Oswald.  They found Marach and Pavic too strong again in the China Open, losing 14–12 in a match tie-break in the quarter-finals.  Daniell returned to play a Challenger event in his home city of Barcelona after that match, losing in his third successive quarter-final, and then teamed up again with Koolhof to play in the Stockholm Open.  They were the only seeded team to reach the semi-finals, where they beat Julien Benneteau and Lucas Pouille, and they met the British pair of Luke Bambridge and Jonny O'Mara in the final.  Losing the first set, they held four set points in the second set tie-break, but were unable to convert any, and then a fifth set point went by as well.  Bambridge and O'Mara won on their second match point, the score being 7–5, 7–6 (8).

Their next event was the Austrian Open, where they lost in a first round match tie-break to Joe Salisbury and Neal Skupski.  Daniell's final tournament for the year was a Challenger event in Eckental, Germany, where he teamed up with his former long-term partner in Marcelo Demoliner.  They were top seeds, but both their first two matches went to three tie-breaks, winning both the deciders 10–7.  Their semi-final was against the German fourth seeds, Kevin Krawietz and Andreas Mies, who had raucous vocal support from the local crowd.  Yet another match tie-break was required, with the crowd going wild as Krawietz and Mies prevailed 10–8.  They went on to win the title.

2019
Daniell and Koolhof began their year in Brisbane, needing tie-breaks of one kind or another in all three matches on their way to the final, where they defeated fourth seeds Rajeev Ram and Joe Salisbury in straight sets, 6–4, 7–6 (6).  It was the fourth ATP World Tour title for each of them, but their first together.  In Auckland they lost in a very close quarter-final, 7–6 (4), 7–6 (5), to the eventual champions, Ben McLachlan and Jan-Lennard Struff, in a match which didn't start until 11.15 pm due to Struff having had a three-hour singles quarter-final match earlier that evening.

In the Australian Open they beat the wildly popular home pair of Lleyton Hewitt and John-Patrick Smith in three sets, before falling to Michael Venus and Raven Klaasen in the second round.  With yet another injury break intervening, it was another month before Daniell played again, he and Koolhof losing in the first round in Acapulco to Feliciano and Marc López.

Phoenix was their next stop, where they lost a very tight quarter-final match in the Phoenix Challenger to eventual champions Jamie Murray and Neal Skupski, 6–7 (8), 6–4, 12–10.  Daniell and Koolhof went in different directions after that, with Daniell losing in the first round of a Challenger at Sophia Antipolis in France, and then partnering David Marrero to victory in the Challenger tournament in Murcia.

Reunited with Koolhof, Daniell next played in the Hungarian Open in Budapest, where they lost in the final to Ken and Neal Skupski.  They made the semi-finals in Estoril before losing to top seeds Łukasz Kubot and Marcelo Melo in the second round of the French Open.  Daniell and Luke Bambridge reached the semi-finals at Surbiton before he and Koolhof were beaten in the final at 's-Hertogenbosch by Dominic Inglot and Austin Krajicek.

Daniell partnered with Leander Paes at Ilkley, losing in the final to Santiago González and Aisam-ul-Haq Qureshi, before rejoining Koolhof at Eastbourne.  They again found Inglot and Krajicek to be a stumbling block, losing in a match tie-break in the quarter-finals.  In a career-best performance for the New Zealander at a Grand Slam event, Daniell and Koolhof got to the quarter-finals at Wimbledon, where they were beaten in straight sets by Ivan Dodig and Filip Polášek.  In another career-best effort, Daniell and Jennifer Brady made the third round of the mixed doubles before losing to eventual semi-finalists Matwé Middelkoop and Yang Zhaoxuan.

Daniell's partnership with Koolhof came to an end at Wimbledon, and he rejoined Paes for the only American grass court tournament, at Newport, where they reached the semi-finals.  First round losses followed at Montreal, Winston-Salem and the US Open, the latter two with Ken Skupski.  Daniell also played mixed doubles at the US Open, partnering Croatia's Darija Jurak, but they were well-beaten in the first round by the second seeds, Gabriela Dabrowski and Mate Pavić.

In September he and Michael Venus won the doubles rubber in New Zealand's Davis Cup tie against Indonesia, before Daniell linked up with what he hoped would be his new long-term partner, Philipp Oswald.  They reached the semi-finals in Moscow and Vienna before finishing the year with a second round loss in the Paris Masters.

2020
Daniell and Oswald resumed in the ASB Classic in Auckland, losing in the final to Luke Bambridge and Ben McLachlan.  They then lost in the first round four times in a row, at the Australian Open to sixth seeds Marcel Granollers and Horacio Zeballos, in New York and Delray Beach to Marcelo Arevalo and Jonny O'Mara and, in somewhat of an upset, to Grigor Dimitrov and Taylor Fritz in Acapulco.

After that it was back to New Zealand for the Davis Cup tie against Venezuela in Auckland, where Daniell teamed up with Artem Sitak for the first time in two years.  New Zealand won the tie 3–1, with Daniell and Sitak beating Luis David Martínez and Jordi Muñoz Abreu 6–3, 7–6 (3) in the doubles rubber.  International play was suspended because of the COVID-19 coronavirus just a few days later.

Daniell resumed his career in the US Open at the beginning of September, where he and Oswald defeated Raven Klaasen and Oliver Marach in the first round, but were upset by the American wild card pair of Christopher Eubanks and Mackenzie McDonald in the second.  They lost in the quarter-finals in Kitzbühel and Forli in the lead-up to the rescheduled French Open, where they lost in the first round to seventh seeds Mate Pavić and Bruno Soares.  That was also their fate when top seeds in Parma, but they followed that by winning the title as third seeds at the new ATP250 tournament in Santa Margherita di Pula, upsetting top seeds Juan Sebastián Cabal and Robert Farah in the final.

Daniell and Oswald then moved on to Cologne, where they lost to French Open champions Kevin Krawietz and Andreas Mies in the semi-finals, and followed that with a quarter-final loss in Nur-Sultan.  Their final tournament for the year was the Paris Masters, where they beat Krawietz and Alexander Zverev in the first round before losing to Jürgen Melzer and Édouard Roger-Vasselin.  Although that was the extent of their on-court activity, Daniell was elected to the ATP Player Council in December as one of the two doubles representatives, replacing Melzer, who retired from competitive tennis after the ATP Finals.

2021-22: Olympics Bronze medalist, hiatus due to knee injury
At the 2020 Summer Olympics he won the bronze medal in doubles with fellow New Zealander Michael Venus defeating Austin Krajicek and Tennys Sandgren.

He suffered a knee injury in April 2022 which ruled him out of Wimbledon and for the rest of the 2022 season.

Olympic medal finals

Doubles: 1 (1 bronze medal)

ATP career finals

Doubles: 15 (5 titles, 10 runners-up)

Challenger and Futures finals

Singles: 4 (2 titles, 2 runners-up)

Doubles: 39 (24 titles, 15 runners-up)

Davis Cup (19)

Note: walkover victory when Pakistan abandoned the tie in 2013 is not counted as a match played
   indicates the outcome of the Davis Cup match followed by the score, date, place of event, the zonal classification and its phase, and the court surface.

Performance timelines

Doubles 
Current through the 2022 Australian Open.

Mixed doubles
Although the US and French Opens took place in 2020, mixed doubles were not included in either event due to the COVID-19 pandemic.

References

External links 
 
 TCGW profile of Marcus Daniell
 3News profile of Marcus Daniell

1989 births
Living people
New Zealand expatriates in the United Kingdom
New Zealand male tennis players
Tennis players from Auckland
Sportspeople from Masterton
Sportspeople from London
Olympic tennis players of New Zealand
Tennis players at the 2016 Summer Olympics
Team Bath athletes
Tennis players at the 2020 Summer Olympics
Olympic bronze medalists for New Zealand
Medalists at the 2020 Summer Olympics
Olympic medalists in tennis
People associated with effective altruism